Huisgen is a surname. Notable people with the surname include:

Andrea Huisgen (born 1990), Spanish beauty pageant winner
Rolf Huisgen (1920–2020), German chemist

See also
Huisken